ZPI may refer to:

 Protein Z-related protease inhibitor, a protein circulating in the blood
 Zero Point Interchange, a cloverleaf interchange in Islamabad, Pakistan
 Pinner tube station, a London Underground station in London, England (National Rail station code ZPI)
 Zampini railway station, India (Indian Railways station code ZPI)